K (also called K Project) is a Japanese anime series created by the animation studio GoHands and GoRA, a group consisting of seven anonymous authors known as Kōhei Azano, Tatsuki Miyazawa, Yukako Kabei, Yashichiro Takahashi, Hideyuki Furuhashi, Suzu Suzuki, and Rei Rairaku. The series is directed by Shingo Suzuki, who also serves as its character designer. It began airing on MBS on October 5, 2012. The anime has been licensed by Viz Media in North America and by Madman Entertainment in Australia. The series is set when Japan is secretly being ruled by seven Kings of psychic clans called the Seven Clans of Color. Yashiro Isana, a seemingly normal student of Ashinaka High School, is targeted by HOMRA of the Red Clan and Scepter 4 of the Blue Clan, following the murder of pacifist Tatara Totsuka from HOMRA. With the help of a highly skilled swordsman named Kuroh Yatogami and a feline Strain with the ability of sensory interference named Neko, Yashiro rediscovers his true identity.

A manga prequel called K: Memory of Red, drawn by Yui Kuroe was serialized in Kodansha's Aria between May 28, 2012 and August 15, 2013. Another prequel manga, K: Stray Dog Story, ran in Kodansha's good! Afternoon between November 2012 and March 2013. A third manga K: Days of Blue, was serialized in Kodansha's Aria between November 2013 and July 2014, and a fourth, K: Countdown, ran in Aria from December 2014 to July 2015, while a fifth, K: Missing Kings, ran in Monthly GFantasy from April to August 2015. Five more manga series; K: The First, Gakuen K, K: Lost small world, K: Dream of Green, and K: Return of Kings, are also still ongoing. Furthermore, two light novels, called K Side:Blue and K Side:Red, were released in October and November 2012. A third light novel called K Side:Black and white was released in May 2013 and another one, K - Lost small world was released in April 2014.

A sequel film was released on July 12, 2014. A visual novel is also in development by Otomate.

A sequel anime project was announced on the official Twitter account of the series. The new anime series, K: Return of Kings, aired from October 3, 2015 to December 26, 2015, rounding up the anime series and delivering its ending.

A new anime project featuring an original story by GoRA and GoHands, titled K: Seven Stories, has been green-lit. GoHands and Shingo Suzuki are returning to produce and direct the anime, respectively.

Plot

Yashiro Isana has lived a relatively ordinary, simple life. He lives in the technologically advanced Shizume City and attends Ashinaka High School, a notable high school that is located on an island just outside the areas. Yashiro is friendly with everyone. Nothing seems wrong about him, except perhaps his habit of forgetting where his school-issued PDA is. However, nothing normal has been happening since the recent murder of Tatara Totsuka, prominent member of the infamous HOMRA. No one knows who exactly killed him but the man responsible bears an uncanny, identical appearance to Yashiro. Seeking vengeance, the Red Clansmen of HOMRA set out to get Yashiro and kill him. Everyone suspects that Yashiro is the murderer.

Media

Anime

The anime began airing on October 5, 2012. The anime has been licensed by Viz Media in North America and by Madman Entertainment in Australia. It was also being streamed on VizAnime video site. The opening theme song is "KINGS" by Angela and the ending theme song is "Tsumetai Heya, Hitori" (冷たい部屋、一人) by Mikako Komatsu. Insert songs include "Circle of Friends" by Yūki Kaji and "Itsuka no Zero Kara" (いつかのゼロから) by Angela. The anime has a movie sequel released in 2014. Viz has also licensed the second season.

Film
It was announced that there will be a sequel to the anime series in the form of a film. The movie was released on July 12, 2014. Its title is "K: Missing Kings" and includes a new character Mishakuji Yukari. The movie takes place one year after anime in the summer. Viz Media has licensed the movie.

It was announced that there will be a six-part film series, titled "K: Seven Stories" and was released between July 7, 2018 and December 1, 2018. Viz Media has licensed the film series.

Light novels

Manga
 
 Illustrated by Yui Kuroe, written by Rei Rairaku (GoRA). Spin-off that focuses on Homra. The story follows events that took place before the TV series.

 
 Illustrated by Saki Minato, written by Tatsuki Miyazawa (GoRA). Spin-off that focuses on Kuroh Yatogami. 

 
 Illustrated by Yui Kuroe, written by Rei Rairaku (GoRA). Spin-off that focuses on Scepter 4. The story follows events that took place before the TV series.

 K - The First
 Illustrated by Rin Kimura, written by Suzu Suzuki (GoRA). Mainly a re-telling of the story in the TV series.
 Gakuen K
 Illustrated by Jirō Suzuki, written by Hideyuki Furuhashi (GoRA). Comedy spin-off where all the K characters are going to high school together.
 K: Lost small world
 Illustrated by Yoru Ōkita, written by Yukako Kabei (GoRA). Focuses on Yata's and Fushimi's past.
 K: Countdown
 Illustrated by Yui Kuroe, written by Rei Rairaku. The story reveals what happens after the Missing Kings movie from the viewpoints of different characters.
 K: Missing Kings
 Illustrated by Haruto Shiota, written by Hideyuki Furuhashi. K: Missing Kings is an adaptation of the film of the same name, and ran in the Monthly GFantasy magazine from April 18, 2015, to August 18, 2015.
 K: Dog and Cat
 Illustrated by Rin Kimura, written by Hideyuki Furuhashi. About Neko and Kuroh. The story takes place between the first season and the movie. Published in G-Fantasy between May 18 and November 18, 2015.
 K: Dream of Green
 Illustrated by Yui Kuroe, written by Rei Rairaku. Began publication in Aria on September 28, 2015.
 K: Return of Kings
 The K: Return of Kings manga is an adaptation of the anime television series of the same name, written by Hideyuki Furuhashi and illustrated by Haruto Shiota. It began serialization in the G Gantasy magazine on October 17, 2015.

Visual novel
A visual novel adaptation was developed by Otomate and subsequently released in 2014. The game is targeted towards a female audience, allowing the player to be the heroine of the story. The player takes on the role of an original character named  who does not show up in the anime. The objective of the game is to pursue one of the available heroes using the school as a setup.

Notes

References

External links
  
 
 K Web Radio 
 

2012 anime television series debuts
2012 manga
2015 anime television series debuts
Action anime and manga
Anime with original screenplays
Animeism
Gangan Comics manga
GoHands
Kodansha manga
PlayStation Portable games
PlayStation Vita games
Science fantasy anime and manga
Seinen manga
Shōjo manga
Shōnen manga
Viz Media anime